Whitethorn Wilderness is a 9,616-acre (3,891ha) wilderness area in the Organ Mountains-Desert Peaks National Monument managed by the U.S. Bureau of Land Management in the U.S. state of New Mexico.  Established in 2019, this Wilderness is located on the western end of the West Potrillo Mountains and named for the abundant Whitethorn acacia, a summer food source for the local population of desert mule deer. The ecosystem is typical of the Chihuahuan Desert.

See also
List of U.S. Wilderness Areas

References

External links
Whitethorn Wilderness Map - BLM
Organ Mountains Desert Peaks National Monument Wilderness - New Mexico Wilderness Alliance

IUCN Category Ib
Wilderness areas of New Mexico
Organ Mountains–Desert Peaks National Monument
Protected areas of Doña Ana County, New Mexico
Protected areas of Luna County, New Mexico
Protected areas established in 2019